Carolina María Marín Martín (born 15 June 1993) is a Spanish professional badminton player. She is an Olympic Champion, three-time World Champion, six-time European Champion, and the former World's No. 1 in BWF rankings for the women's singles discipline, holding the World No. 1 title for 66 weeks. Widely regarded as one of the greatest female athletes in women's singles badminton, she holds the distinction of having won a medal in almost every BWF tournament, along with the consecutive golds at the World Championships, and the European Championships.She is also known for her very vocal celebration after each point.

She has become the World Champion in the women's singles three times, winning in 2014, 2015, and 2018, thereby becoming the first-ever female badminton athlete to have achieved this feat. She has also consecutively won the European Championships title six times, in 2014, 2016, 2017, 2018, 2021 and 2022. She won the Olympics gold medal in women's singles at the 2016 Rio Olympics.

Marín was appointed as the brand ambassador of football major LaLiga and Meliá Hotels International for its promotion in other countries.

Career 
Carolina Marín in her earlier childhood was a keen Flamenco dancer. She learned of badminton when a friend introduced her to the sport. She fell in love with the sport, and decided to stop dancing and play badminton wholeheartedly. At the age of eight, she started playing badminton at the IES La Orden in Huelva. She says she had to leave her hometown and her family at a very young age to travel all the way to Madrid for training at National Centre.

2009–2011: First international title and European Junior Champions 

In 2009, she became the first Spanish badminton player to win a silver medal first, at the European Junior Championships, and also in the same year, won the gold medal at the European U-17 Junior Championships. She won her first major title at the Irish International tournament coming through the qualification stage and beating the Dutch player Rachel Van Cutsen in the final in the rubber game.

In 2011, she alongside her teammate, Beatriz Corrales, made history for the Spanish badminton, after placing two representatives of Spain in the final at the continental European Junior Championships held in Vantaa, Finland, and Marín grabbed the gold medal. She also competed at the World Junior Championships in Taipei, reaching the semi-finals, but lost to Elisabeth Purwaningtyas of Indonesia and settled for the bronze medal.

2013–2014: First Grand Prix title, European and World Champions 

In 2013, she became the first Spanish badminton player to win a Grand Prix Gold title after winning the London Grand Prix Gold. In August, Marín played for the Bangalore-based team Banga Beats in the inaugural edition of the Indian Badminton League (IBL). In April, she won her first European Championships title.

On 31 August 2014, she defeated Li Xuerui of China in the World Championships women's singles final and became the first Spaniard to win a World Championship title and the third European female player to achieve the gold medal, after Lene Køppen (1977) and Camilla Martin (1999). At the age of 21, she became the youngest European that won the World Championships ever.

2015: Five Superseries title, second World Championships and World #1 
In 2015, she won the All England Open, her first Superseries Premier title in her first Superseries Premier final after defeating Saina Nehwal in the final with score 16–21, 21–14, 21–7. The title propelled her to rank number 4 in the world ranking and, for the first time, no. 1 in the Superseries standing. At India Open, she had the chance to unseat Li Xuerui as the new world no. 1, however, she narrowly lost to Thai prodigy Ratchanok Intanon in a close three games at the semi-finals stage. She rose to a career-high as world no. 2 in the world ranking on 2 April.

On 5 April, Marín won her second straight Superseries Premier title, beating Olympic champion Li Xuerui for the second consecutive time at the 2015 Malaysia Open with a score of 19–21, 21–19, 21–17. In August, she defended her title at the World Championship by beating Saina Nehwal of India in 21–16, 21–19. 2015 was the golden year for Marín, where in addition to defending the World Championships title, she also won other Superseries titles such as the Australian Open, French Open, and Hong Kong Open.

2016: Olympics gold 
In August, she represented her country at the Rio Olympics. She arrived at Rio as the number one seed and won a gold medal by beating India's P. V. Sindhu in the women's singles final with a score of 19–21, 21–12, 21–15. She made history by becoming the first non-Asian to win the Olympic badminton women's singles gold medal. An indoor arena in Huelva is named after her honour, with Marín herself attending the inauguration.

2017–2018: Fourth European and Third World Championships title 
In 2017, Marín won the Japan Open Superseries title after beating He Bingjiao of China in the final, winning a Superseries title after almost two years. At the Hong Kong Open, which took place in late November, Marín retired to Michelle Li, losing 21–19, 13–21, 8–11, due to a hip injury that she sustained during the match. Marín later announced on Twitter and Instagram that, due to her hip injury, she would not be participating in the season-ending Dubai World Superseries Finals.

On 29 April 2018, she won her fourth consecutive European Championships title in her home soil Huelva, Spain, by beating Evgeniya Kosetskaya with a score of 21–15, 21–7 in the final. On 5 August, she won the title in the World Championships by defeating P. V. Sindhu of India in straight games 21–19, 21–10, making her the first female player in history to win three World Championships titles. In September, she won World Tour titles at the Japan and China Open.

2019–2020: ACL injury and comeback 
Marín began her 2019 season with a runner-up effort at the Malaysia Masters, where she lost to Ratchanok Intanon in straight games. On 27 January, Marín suffered a ruptured anterior cruciate ligament (ACL) injury during the Indonesia Masters final against Saina Nehwal, when she was 10–3 ahead in the first games. Marín subsequently retired from the match and underwent the ACL reconstruction surgery as soon as she was flown back to Madrid the same day. She had a recovery for four months, dedicate 10 hours a day to rehabilitation between the physical and technical, with morning and afternoon physiotherapy sessions, and swimming pool work.

In September, after an eight-month break forced by the injury, Marín returned to competition at the 2019 Vietnam Open but suffered an opening round defeat to Supanida Katethong. However, she was able to bounce back and, on 22 September, she won the China Open, defeating Tai Tzu-ying in the finals with a score of 14–21, 21–17, 21–18. This was Marín's first title of the season, which she followed with the semi-finals at the Denmark Open, where she was defeated in three tight games by Nozomi Okuhara. She reached the final of the French Open next week, where she was defeated by Korean youngster An Se-young in three games 21–16, 18–21, 5–21. Her achievements in the last three tournaments succeeded in bringing her back into the world top 10 of BWF women's singles ranking. She further won Syed Modi and Italian International tournaments later in the year.

Marín started the 2020 season at the Southeast Asian tour on a positive note; reaching the semi-finals of Malaysia Masters where she lost to Chen Yufei. A week later, she then reached the final of the Indonesia Masters, where she narrowly missed the title after getting defeated from Ratchanok Intanon in three games 19–21, 21–11, 18–21. She continued her good form and thereafter reached the semi-finals of Thailand Masters, which she lost to top seed Akane Yamaguchi in a close rubber game. In February, she reached the final of her home event Barcelona Spain Masters, where she lost in an upset to rising Thai star Pornpawee Chochuwong in the rubber games 21–11, 16–21, 18–21. In March, she competed as 8th seeds in the All England Open, but stopped by the eventual champion Tai Tzu-ying in the semi-finals.

In July, Marín's father died following an accident in February. She reached the final of the Denmark Open in October for the very first time but was defeated by Okuhara in straight games.

2021–2022 
Marín won the first title of the year, the Thailand Open Super 1000 event, by beating World no. 1 Tai Tzu-ying in two comfortable games. She didn't lose any game in the whole tournament. Continuing her scintillating form, she won the second edition of Thailand Open, the Toyota Thailand Open, also a super 1000 event by beating Tai yet again. In contesting her first-ever World Tour Finals final, she lost to same rival Tai in three games after failing to capitalize her lead in the final game. She won her first world tour title in Switzerland by beating reigning World champion P. V. Sindhu with a very dominating display, winning 21–12, 21–5. Marín planned to compete at the All England Open but pulled out of the competition due to an injury she suffered in the first round of the Swiss Open.

Marín made history as the first-ever player to claim five consecutive titles at the European Championships, defeating young Dane Line Christophersen in the final. She was expected to defend her title at the 2020 Tokyo Olympics but was forced to withdraw due to knee injury she suffered in June while training.

In 2022, 18 months after Marín second ACL injury, she advanced to the French Open final, but lost the match to He Bingjiao in a close rubber games.

Achievements

Olympic Games 
Women's singles

World Championships 
Women's singles

European Championships 
Women's singles

BWF World Junior Championships 
Girls' singles

European Junior Championships 
Girls' singles

BWF World Tour (7 titles, 9 runners-up) 
The BWF World Tour, which was announced on 19 March 2017 and implemented in 2018, is a series of elite badminton tournaments sanctioned by the Badminton World Federation (BWF). The BWF World Tours are divided into levels of World Tour Finals, Super 1000, Super 750, Super 500, Super 300 (part of the HSBC World Tour), and the BWF Tour Super 100.

Women's singles

BWF Superseries (6 titles, 4 runners-up)

The BWF Superseries, which was launched on 14 December 2006 and implemented in 2007, was a series of elite badminton tournaments, sanctioned by the Badminton World Federation (BWF). BWF Superseries levels were Superseries and Superseries Premier. A season of Superseries consisted of twelve tournaments around the world that had been introduced since 2011. Successful players were invited to the Superseries Finals, which were held at the end of each year.

Women's singles

  BWF Superseries Finals tournament
  BWF Superseries Premier tournament
  BWF Superseries tournament

BWF Grand Prix (2 titles, 3 runners-up) 
The BWF Grand Prix had two levels, the Grand Prix and Grand Prix Gold. It was a series of badminton tournaments sanctioned by the Badminton World Federation (BWF) and played between 2007 and 2017.

Women's singles

  BWF Grand Prix Gold tournament
  BWF Grand Prix tournament

BWF International Challenge/Series (9 titles, 5 runners-up) 
Women's singles

  BWF International Challenge tournament
  BWF International Series tournament

Performance timeline

National team 
 Senior level

Individual competitions 
 Junior level

 Senior level

Career overview 
The table below gives the overview of Carolina Marín performance data in singles and doubles.

Record against selected opponents 
Record against year-end Finals finalists, World Championships semi-finalists, and Olympic quarter-finalists. Accurate as of 5 November 2022.

Books 
with Fernando Rivas: Gana el partido de tu vida. Editorial Planeta, 2016
#Puedo porque pienso que puedo. Harper Collins, 2020

References

External links 

 
 
 
 
 
 
 Carolina Marín - Season 1 - Prime Video

1993 births
Living people
Sportspeople from Huelva
Spanish female badminton players
Badminton players at the 2010 Summer Youth Olympics
Badminton players at the 2012 Summer Olympics
Badminton players at the 2016 Summer Olympics
Olympic badminton players of Spain
Olympic gold medalists for Spain
Olympic medalists in badminton
Medalists at the 2016 Summer Olympics
World No. 1 badminton players
BWF Best Female Player of the Year
21st-century Spanish women